
Year 35 BC was either a common year starting on Thursday or Friday or a leap year starting on Wednesday, Thursday or Friday (link will display the full calendar) of the Julian calendar (the sources differ, see leap year error for further information) and a common year starting on Thursday of the Proleptic Julian calendar. At the time, it was known as the Year of the Consulship of Cornificius and Sextus (or, less frequently, year 719 Ab urbe condita). The denomination 35 BC for this year has been used since the early medieval period, when the Anno Domini calendar era became the prevalent method in Europe for naming years.

Events 
 By place 

 Roman Republic 
 Illyria becomes a Roman province. Gaius Julius Caesar Octavian conducts a rendezvous with the Roman fleet under Marcus Vipsanius, which is engaged in clearing the Dalmatian coast of piracy.
 Pannonia is attacked by Octavian Caesar, who conquers and sacks the stronghold Siscia (Sisak) of the Segestani, which is taken after a 30-day siege. The country is not definitely subdued, however, until 9 BC.
 Sextus Pompeius defeats the governor of Asia, Gaius Furnius, with three legions and seizes Nicaea and Nicomedia (modern Izmit).
 Marcus Titius arrives in Syria with a large army and marches to Asia Minor. Sextus is caught in Miletus and executed without trial.

 India 
 Azes I, Indo-Scythian ruler, completes the domination of the Scythians in northern India.

Deaths 
 Aristobulus III, high priest of Judea (drowned) (b. 53 BC)
 Sextus Pompeius, Roman general (executed) (b. 67 BC)

References